Çaylı or Chayli is a Turkish and Azeri place name meaning "place with tea [plants]" and may refer to several places:

Azerbaijan
Çaylı Kommuna
Çaylı, Bilasuvar
Çaylı, Goygol
Çaylı, Hajigabul
Çaylı, Qazakh
Çaylı (Chayly Pervyye), Shamakhi
Çaylı (Chayly Vtoryye), Shamakhi
Çaylı, Shamkir
Çaylı, Tartar

Iran
Chayli, Iran, a village in Golestan Province

Turkey
Çaylı, Adıyaman, a village in the Adıyaman district, Adıyaman Province
Çaylı, Çerkeş
Çaylı, İliç
Çaylı, İzmir, a town in Ödemiş district, İzmir Province
Çaylı, Nazilli, a village in the Nazilli district, Aydın Province
Çaylı, Nilüfer
Çaylı, Tefenni
Çaylı, Yüreğir, a village in the Yüreğir district, Adana Province

See also
Chaylu (disambiguation)